Magnolia rimachii is a small to medium-sized tree of the family Magnoliaceae commonly reaching 8 to 15 m high.

Description
Magnolia rimachii has chartaceous elliptic leaves 12–26 cm long and 5–10 cm broad. Flowers are fragrant and can have 6 or 7 obovate petals 2–4.5 cm long and 1–2 cm wide. The elliptic fruit can be ca. 3.5 cm long.

References

rimachii
Trees of the Amazon
Trees of Peru
Trees of Ecuador